Heptanoyl chloride is a seven-carbon acyl chloride with a straight-chain structure that is used as a reagent in organic synthesis.

References

Acyl chlorides